Johann Paul (born May 5, 1981) is a footballer who plays as a midfielder for Vierzon FC. Born in France, he represented Madagascar at international level.

In 2006, during a match between his club Châtellerault and Angers, Paul nearly died on the pitch after suffering a heart attack.

Career statistics
Scores and results list Madagascar's goal tally first.

External links

References

1981 births
Living people
People from Issoudun
People with acquired Malagasy citizenship
Sportspeople from Indre
French sportspeople of Malagasy descent
Malagasy footballers
Footballers from Centre-Val de Loire
Association football midfielders
Madagascar international footballers
Ligue 2 players
Championnat National players
Championnat National 3 players
LB Châteauroux players
US Créteil-Lusitanos players
Pau FC players
SO Châtellerault players
Amiens SC players
ÉFC Fréjus Saint-Raphaël players
Vierzon FC players